Deja Entendu (French for "already heard") is the second studio album by American rock band Brand New, released on June 17, 2003 by Triple Crown Records and Razor & Tie. It was widely praised for showing the band's maturation from their pop punk debut Your Favorite Weapon, and critics described the album as the moment when the band "started showing ambition to look beyond the emo/post-hardcore scene that birthed them." 

The album, considered the band's "breakthrough", was Brand New's first to chart in the United States (at number 63), and its two singles "The Quiet Things That No One Ever Knows" and "Sic Transit Gloria... Glory Fades" both reached the top 40 in the United Kingdom Singles Chart and earned MTV airplay. It was certified Gold nearly four years after its release. Its commercial success led to Brand New signing with DreamWorks/Interscope Records shortly after.

The album received very positive reviews and has since been placed on numerous lists as one of the greatest albums of the decade and from the emo genre.

Background and composition
Brand New's second studio album was written in "the year-and-a-half or two years" that they were touring the material from Your Favorite Weapon. According to drummer Brian Lane, "Jesse [Lacey] wrote a lot of the lyrics about different things than 'I just broke up with my girlfriend' for the new record." Lacey wrote the songs on an acoustic guitar in his bedroom.

Several of the song titles reference films. The first track entitled "Tautou" references the lead actress, Audrey Tautou, in the movie Amélie. "Okay I Believe You, But My Tommy Gun Don't" is a line from Home Alone 2: Lost in New York, and "Sic Transit Gloria...Glory Fades" is a quote from Wes Anderson's film Rushmore. In addition, the line "And I've seen what happens to the wicked and proud when they decide to try to take on the throne for the crown" (from "Jaws Theme Swimming") is a reference to a line from the 1999 film Dogma, specifically referencing a line of Matt Damon's character Loki. "I Will Play My Game Beneath the Spin Light" is a quote from the Bruce Brooks sports novel The Moves Make the Man, and borrows lines from the song "Chumming the Ocean" by the band Archers of Loaf.

"Me vs. Maradona vs. Elvis" is a song that Lacey describes as being about his worst nightmare, turning into a washed-up figure after his prime has ended. The title draws a comparison to Elvis Presley, who died from a drug overdose, and Diego Maradona, who suffered from drug addiction and was accused of domestic violence.

"Guernica", whose title references the Picasso painting of the same name, was written about Lacey's grandfather and his struggle with cancer. "Good to Know That If I Ever Need Attention All I Have to Do Is Die" criticizes the music industry and "when managers, labels, agents and lawyers get their claws on the prize money".

The song "Play Crack the Sky" was about the 1951 shipwreck of the FV Pelican at Montauk Point, New York where 45 people lost their lives within a mile of the lighthouse. Lacey claimed the song "touches on parts of life that I don't talk about a lot [...] I have grown up around water being from living on Long Island. Surfing, sailing, fishing, that's a huge part of my life apart from the band." The ending of the song is a reference to the run-out groove on the Beatles' Sgt. Pepper's Lonely Hearts Club Band (1967). During a show on his 2007 solo tour with Kevin Devine, Jesse explained that the title was a reference to Mylon LeFevre song "Crack the Sky".

The album was produced by Steven Haigler. Its cover art was designed by musicians Don and Ryan Clark of the band Demon Hunter, who ran the graphic design studio Invisible Creature. The band contacted the studio in early 2003 with just the album's title as a reference point, contacting the studio only once before receiving the final product. Don Clark said in 2015 that, "If I could go back, there are a zillion little things I would do differently. I was much younger (and greener) at the time, so some of the light and shadow work is a bit clunky." However, both Clark and DIY agreed that the cover became an "iconic image" for an album that "from a musical standpoint, was way ahead of its time."

Release
Deja Entendu was released through Triple Crown and Razor & Tie on June 17, 2003. Brand New went on a tour of the US in July 2003 with support from Moneen, The Beautiful Mistake and Senses Fail. "The Quiet Things That No One Ever Knows" was released as a single on October 6. The album was released in the UK on October 13, through Eat Sleep. On November 3, the album was released in Australia through Below Par. "Sic Transit Gloria... Glory Fades" was released to radio on November 18. In January 2004, the band went on a tour of the UK with support from Straylight Run and Moneen. Lead single "The Quiet Things That No One Ever Knows" peaked at No. 37 on Billboard's Alternative Songs chart and at No. 39 on the UK Singles Chart, while "Sic Transit Gloria... Glory Fades" reached No. 37 in the UK.

The first pressing in 2003 was 1,000 records. On March 2, 2015, the band stated that they were going to re-press the record. It would be first released for Record Store Day (April 18) in limited packaging, with a wider release on May 5. Both were pressed on 180-gram black vinyl.

Commercial performance 
After seven weeks since its release, the album matched Your Favorite Weapons sales of 51,000 copies. The album was certified Gold by the Recording Industry Association of America on May 29, 2007, nearly four years after its original release. It is Brand New's only album to date that has been certified.

Brand New, who would soon sign with DreamWorks Records (which became incorporated into Interscope Records), were recognized as part of a trend that saw bands labeled as "emo" getting signed to major record label deals in an attempt to sign the next big thing. Spin dubbed this trend "mainstreamo", but Lacey rebuked the hype, believing that "I think it’s all gonna fall through in a year and a half, maybe sooner. This is becoming like ’80s hair metal all over again. All you can really do is try hard to be one of the bands that does manage to stick.” The program director for influential Washington, D.C. rock radio station WHFS noted that "we haven’t reached the point where Puddle of Mudd fans are calling up requesting Brand New.”

Critical reception

Deja Entendu received very positive reviews from critics, who praised the band's evolution from their debut album. 

AllMusic gave Deja Entendu four out of five stars, stating that:As of 2003, Brand New had sidestepped any notion that they'd be stuck in the prototypical mold found on Your Favorite Weapon. Unlike their debut, Deja Entendu isn't all about bitter breakups and doesn't fall into a permanent punk-pop hole. Produced by Steven Haigler (Pixies, Quicksand), this sophomore effort finds Brand New maturing, reaching for textures and song structures instead of clichés.

Rolling Stone praised the album: "Deja Entendu is an emo masterpiece if ever there was one, applying the intensity of post-hardcore and oddly sexy grooves to sophisticated and impassioned songwriting."

Pitchfork gave the album a positive review, complimenting its "air of substance and maturity" and comparing "The Boy Who Blocked His Own Shot" to The Smiths.  

Sputnikmusic gave the album five stars out of five, proclaiming that "We could relate to the way that Lacey screamed "This is the reason you're alone, this is the rise and the fall" at the end of 'Tommy Gun.' We understood the desperation in his voice and the subtle undertones of sexual frustration in 'Me vs. Maradona vs. Elvis.' We were just beginning to see how brilliant the lyrics were to 'Play Crack The Sky', a song that simultaneously deals with love, death, and relationships on a singular metaphorical level. These emotions were new to us, and we had a feeling that they meant something to the man singing about them too." IGN rated the album 9.7/10, calling it "probably the best underground release this year."

Accolades and legacy
The album ranked at No. 25 on Sputnikmusic's list of the Top 100 Albums of the 2000s, one of two Brand New albums on the list (The Devil and God Are Raging Inside Me was included at No. 20). Rolling Stone placed the album at No. 19 in their list of the 40 Greatest Emo Albums of All Time, ahead of Your Favorite Weapon at No. 29. The album was included in Rock Sounds 101 Modern Classics list at number 21. Rock Sound later wrote the album's "slow burn appeal and genre-defining quality" would define the album as "an emo classic." They also wrote it would become the "blueprint [that] would spawn scores of imitators, [and] make alternative icons of its creators". NME listed the album as one of "20 Emo Albums That Have Resolutely Stood The Test Of Time". In 2022, Loudwire listed it at No. 43 on its list of the 50 Greatest Pop Punk Albums.

Track listing

Personnel
 Jesse Lacey – lead vocals, rhythm guitar
 Vincent Accardi – lead guitar, backing vocals
 Garrett Tierney – bass guitar, backing vocals
 Brian Lane – drums, percussion

Charts

Weekly charts

Singles

Certifications

References
Citations

Sources

External links

Deja Entendu  at YouTube (streamed copy where licensed)

Brand New (band) albums
2003 albums
Triple Crown Records albums
Razor & Tie albums
Albums produced by Mike Sapone